The UST Growling Tigers basketball is the intercollegiate men's basketball program of the University of Santo Tomas. The school has won 19 basketball titles including one in the National Collegiate Athletic Association (NCAA). They are one of the winningest teams in the University Athletic Association of the Philippines (UAAP) with 18 championships, the last coming in 2006 during Pido Jarencio's rookie year of coaching. Returning as their head coach as of February 13, 2023 is Pido Jarencio, replacing Bal David.

Schedule overview
The Growling Tigers' preparation for the season begins in late-March, or at the tailend of the academic year. It was recently moved to late-April following a shift in the opening of the school calendar from June to August. UST usually plays in two major preseason tournaments for two to three months and they sometimes join provincial pocket tournaments in the lead-up to the UAAP tournament. On many occasions, a Team B lineup from their training pool is fielded to competitions that run parallel to another tournament.

Among the offseason tournaments that the Growling Tigers participate in are the Filoil Flying V Preseason Cup, MILCU Under-25 Summer tournament, Breakdown Basketball Invitational tournament, PBA D-League Aspirants' Cup and the Father Martin Cup.

In the 14-game UAAP men's basketball tournament, the Tigers play from twice to thrice weekly against the seven other member collegiate teams in the course of the two round-robin elimination games from early September until mid-November. Playoff games may last until December, after which the postseason tournaments begin.

In the postseason, UST usually qualifies to participate in the Philippine Collegiate Champions League, depending on their rank from the concluded UAAP season.

History

The Growling Tigers were originally known as the "Glowing Goldies," with the name derived from UST's school colors of gold and white. Their colors were in turn inspired by the flag of the Papal States since their pontifical status was obtained in 1902.

Early years
The history of UST's basketball program dates back to 1920 when they joined the Liga Catolica, an interscholastic sports league of Manila-based Catholic schools that was founded by San Beda, La Salle, Ateneo, Letran, and San Vicente de Paul College.

The Glowing Goldies co-founded the NCAA in 1924 and won their first and only championship in 1930. They were coached by Chito Calvo who also served as the school's director of physical education. The team improved from being cellar dwellers in 1928 to finishing second in the standings behind University of the Philippines in 1929.

An experimental sports meet among the triumvirate of UP, UST and National University called the "Big Three" and formed in 1930, arose from the schools' dissatisfaction with the NCAA's plan to incorporate the league with the Bureau of Commerce. A permission to stage the games was eventually granted by the league on the condition that NCAA events would be given priority over the use of sports facilities. The three schools later withdrew from the NCAA and the Big Three was formally inaugurated as a league in 1932. The Goldies won the championships from 1931 to 1934 behind the exploits of their three national team members, Jacinto Ciria Cruz, Primitivo Martinez, and Herminio Silva.

Apart from the Big Three League, the Goldies also competed in the National Open Championship and tournaments organized by the Philippine Amateur Athletic Federation where they won titles in 1935, 1937, 1940, and 1941.

With the addition of Far Eastern University to the group in 1938, the Big Three League was dissolved and the UAAP was inaugurated. The Goldies lost to the Tamaraws in a game that decided the tournament's first champion. UST went on to record their first back-to-back championships in the next two years, although the 1939 crown was shared with FEU and UP when they all finished with identical 4–2 win–loss records. Herr Silva, who had ventured into coaching after the 1938 season took over the Goldies when Dr. Jose Rodríguez resigned. The 1940 champion team became known to sports scribes as the "Captains' Team" due to the presence of five skippers in the lineup. Aside from then team captain Gabby Fajardo, the others who had served as the Goldies' leaders in past tournaments were Francisco Vestil, Salvador Siao, Enrique Novales, and Gabby's brother Fely who was a transferee from Letran.

Postwar era
The postwar resumption of the UAAP in 1946 after a five-year absence saw the Glowing Goldies record their first undefeated season when they won all six of their games to claim their third straight championship. The team was honored in a ceremony on May 12, 1996, to commemorate the 50th year of the championship.

The following year, the Goldies were declared co-champions with FEU for the second time in the UAAP. In the deciding match, UST was leading towards the end of regulation when a power outage struck the Rizal Memorial Coliseum, forcing play to stop. When power had not been restored after an hour, the tournament organizers decided to award the 1947 championship to both teams. Francisco Vestil was named Most valuable player of the season.

UST won over FEU again in 1949 for their sixth straight championship. It was their fourth straight title in the postwar era. The Tamaraws got their revenge when they defeated the Goldies for the UAAP, as well as the Intercollegiate championships in 1950.

Redemption came early for UST when they won the 1951 National Open Championships in January after defeating the San Miguel Braves team of their former coach Chito Calvo, 47–41 in the Finals. This was the last time that a team from the UAAP won the National Open. The Glowing Goldies went on to win their first unshared three-peat championship in the UAAP from 1951 to 1953. In the 1951 UAAP Finals, Coach Silva put into play his peculiar strategy of dribbling the ball until time ran out. UST preserved their lead over FEU and went on to win the championship on a 43–34 score. Ning Ramos was selected MVP by the Philippine Sportswriters Association in 1952. He was joined by teammate Ramon Manulat in the Mythical team selection.

The Goldies finished third behind FEU and first time champions NU in 1954. Francis Wilson was included in the PSA's Mythical first team selection, while Eddie Pacheco made it to the second team.

In 1955, Fely Fajardo replaced longtime coach Herr Silva after the latter had fallen ill during his coaching stint at the 1954 World Championship in Brazil. UST was back to their winning ways when they dethroned NU for the UAAP title and then claimed the National Intercollegiate Championship in the postseason after beating University of the Visayas, 76–66. In the National Finals, the Goldies forced an overtime when team captain Andy Bautista converted both free throws to tie the score at 62–all. Wilson led the team in scoring with 21 points, while Jose Petel, Egie Serafico, and Benjamin Cabrera added 15, 12, and 10 points respectively.

UST–UE rivalry
The Glowing Goldies met University of the East in the 1957 Final, in what was to be their first of eight championship meetings that spans until the beginning of the 1970s decade. The Warriors joined the league as an expansion team in 1952 with Manila Central University, Adamson, and the University of Manila. UST lost to UE, 55–64.

UST got back at UE in 1959 by breaking their back-to-back championship streak after winning, 66–55. The Goldies who won the first round pennant struggled in the next round and had to go through a playoff against FEU in order to qualify for the right to face the defending champions in the Finals. They defeated the Tamaraws, 84–67 and then went on to deploy a tight man-to-man defense against the Warriors in the championship game. They had succeeded in limiting UE's leading scorer Roehl Nadurata to only four points, all of which came from free throws. The 6'3" Asencion Aparicio who hardly played long minutes was responsible for the defense on Nadurata. The Goldies' center was equally effective on offense when he scored 20 points in the game. This was the 11th championship won by UST since their 1939 title.

A loss to FEU in the four-team championship round prevented the Glowing Goldies from defending their championship. They made it to the semifinals by defeating the MCU Tigers, 87–72 in a playoff for the fourth and last berth where UE, FEU and UP had already qualified. FEU's Romy Diaz set a new scoring record when he tallied 40 points in ousting UST, 91–81 from the 1960 Finals. Valentino Rosabal won the 1960 Rookie of the year award.

In 1963, the UAAP introduced the twice-to-beat advantage format for the first time to replace the existing one-game championship. UST defeated UE in two games, but the victory was placed under protest by the Warriors. The subject of the protest was a UST player's ineligibility for having played for a commercial team in the National Open in the summer, which was against league rules. The protest was upheld by the UAAP board, and as a result awarded the championship to UE. The Warriors also became the recipients of the El Oro trophy for having been champions for three straight years. Rosabal was named MVP, while point guard Aric del Rosario won the 1963 Rookie of the year award.

UST did not have a promising start to their 1964 season. They lost to the University of the Visayas in the National Collegiate Championship in March and Fajardo had stepped down as coach at the start of the UAAP tournament in September. Sonny Reyes and Orly Bauzon, their team's top scorers dropped out of the team to play in the MICAA. Herr Silva returned as their interim coach, but the Goldies still lost their opening game against UE, 81–82. Things began to look up when Caloy Loyzaga, who had just retired as a player in April got on board to be the team's permanent head coach. The Goldies won their next games and got back at UE on a close 58–57 win to qualify to the Finals against FEU. UST had erased FEU's twice-to-beat advantage and turned the championship into a best-of-three affair when they won, 61–60. Aric del Rosario scored all of his team's points to put the Goldies ahead 60–55 from a 53–54 deficit. In the next game, FEU's Rolando Mojica scored 35 points to lead his team over UST, 69–58 and extend the Finals to a deciding third game. It was another close game with a series of one-point lead changes until the final ten seconds when the Goldies' Romeo Ramos was fouled by an FEU defender while driving to the basket. Ramos split his free throws to tie the score at 64–all as time ran out in regulation. UST managed to get the 71–68 overtime win and the championship. According to sports historian Jose Maria Escoda, newspapers at that time described the UST–FEU series as the most exhilarating matchup in the postwar history of the UAAP.

The Goldies met UE again in the 1965 UAAP Finals. They prevented the Warriors from scoring a season sweep after winning their second-round game, 74-70 in overtime. They ended up tied at first place in the standings with identical 7-1 records. The Goldies won the first game of the best-of-three series, 69–67 after Danny Florencio, their rookie forward out of FEATI University made back-to-back steals that were converted to baskets in the game's final seconds. The Warriors retaliated with a 72–65 win in Game 2, and then took the crown in the deciding third game of the series. Florencio erupted for 40 points, but fouled out after committing two quick fouls on UE's Sonny Jaworski, the last coming in the final ten seconds of the game and with the score tied at 84–all. The Warriors forced two turnovers on UST and scored the last four points for an 88–84 victory.

The 1966 preseason bore testament to the tenacity of the Goldies' rivalry with the Warriors when their National Collegiate game ended in a brawl. UST was trying to prevent UE from once again completing a sweep when in the last four seconds of the game, a ten-minute long fight broke out on the playing court. The game was stopped as the referees were unable to take control of the situation, with the Goldies trailing 67–73. As a result of a hearing held by the Basketball Association of the Philippines, six players from both teams were each handed down a one-year suspension. UE's Jaworski, Nat Canson, Fernando Paseos, and UST's Florencio, team captain Manuel Tan, and Ceferino dela Paz were the recipients of the ban for throwing fists and elbows during the altercation. The penalties were later reduced to six months upon appeal by both schools, but the players would still miss the first month of the UAAP tournament which was set to start in August. The Warriors were awarded the National Collegiate championship, citing a rule that if the game is interrupted after the 35th minute, the team that leads is declared the winner. The two teams met again to contest the UAAP crown after finishing the elimination rounds with identical 6–2 records. The Goldies were swept in the best-of-three series, with the second game ending on a close 77-78 score.

Egie Serafico was appointed head coach after the 1966 season when Caloy Loyzaga resigned to assume coaching duties for the national team. UST faced the Warriors for the third straight year in the 1967 UAAP Finals. The series had been contested once again in a deciding third game, which took a strange turn at the start of the second half. Both Serafico and Baby Dalupan, coaches of the two opposing teams refused to be the first to submit to the game officials their list of their starting five prior to the tip-off. Even as the Glowing Goldies led by 11 points at 51–40 at halftime, their starters led by Bogs Adornado, Lawrence Mumar, and Cirilo Fabiosa were already in foul trouble. After repeated warnings to both teams, referee Antonio Esclabanan declared the game a no contest, citing the unsportsmanlike behavior of the two coaches. The league later recognized UST and UE as co-champions of the season.

The Goldies ended up as runners-up to the Warriors for two more years in 1968 and 1971, sandwiching UE's two undefeated seasons in 1969 and 1970 where they were declared automatic champions. UST was the last team to try to prevent the sweep in 1969 after all the other three teams lost to UE in the elimination games. The Goldies went unsuccessful and bowed to the Warriors, 96–105. UE won two more games for a 10–0 sweep the following year, adding victories over the UAAP's sixth member, the Adamson Falcons who had been readmitted to the league that year.

Cordero and Jarencio eras
Former UST forward Francis Wilson was appointed head coach in 1975. He had only managed to steer the team to a fifth-place finish that year, and despite a turnaround season in 1976 where they ended up as third placers, four of the Goldies' senior players left to play in the MICAA after a rumored falling-out with the coaching staff. This left the 1977 roster with eight rookies and six second-stringers, with the exception of third year guard Ray Obias who became a scoring revelation the previous season. While the Glowing Goldies were no longer championship contenders, their rivalry with UE continued when the two teams battled towards the end of eliminations for the #4 rank in the standings. UST prevailed with a down-the-wire 76–75 win. They were actually leading at 76–72 with 43 seconds left in the game, but the Warriors scored three straight unanswered points. The Goldies weathered the uprising by keeping possession from the remaining five seconds until the buzzer. UST next defeated UP to prevent them from entering the Finals against FEU. Edmund Yee, Ricky Valero, and Danny Calsado led the Goldies with their balanced scoring, but it was the team's 18 steals that carried UST to victory. The Goldies ended up at fourth in the standings with 5 wins and 5 losses, while UE fell to fifth with a 4–6 record.

Serafico came back to replace Wilson as UST's coach in 1978. He had laid out a two-year rebuilding plan for the team that has failed to advance to the postseason in recent years. The Glowing Goldies had again become UE's adversary when they met in 1979 for the playoff that would determine FEU's opponent in the Finals. Both teams ended the eliminations with a 9–3 record. UST came out on top with a 114–104 win and dethroned the Warriors, who held the 1978 title. Yee led in scoring with 34 points, but it was his collaboration with Ed Cordero and Frank Natividad that gave the team the win. The three combined for 28 points in an eight-minute stretch to surmount UE's 60–45 lead in the second half. Serafico's program saw an early success with the Goldies' entry to the Finals. UST's offense was anchored mainly on Cordero, the team's center who had set a scoring record when he finished with 54 points against Adamson in the first round. He later revealed that he had been nursing a fever prior to the playoff game against UE. His condition worsened and was hospitalized after the game, making him unavailable to play in the championship where FEU held a twice-to-beat advantage. Natividad and Yee took up the scoring cudgels with 38 and 25 respectively, but were soundly beaten, 89–100. The team trailed FEU at the half, 27–51.

Like in 1969, the Goldies were again faced with the task of preventing an automatic championship by a rival team. FEU went undefeated in 11 games and their last scheduled match in the two round-robin eliminations of the 1980 season was against UST. Cordero, who was still the center of the team's offense was supported in their starting lineup by Edgar Bilasano, Louis Cu, Nestor Lugue, and Paquito Maristela. Maristela had replaced the already graduated Edmund Yee at the forward position. The 6'4" Cesar Calayag alternated with Lugue in guarding Anthony Williams, their opponent's high-scoring American forward. The Goldies who had trailed FEU, 37–42 at the half opened up a rally led by rookie Raymond Fran to put the team to within two at 49–51. The lead changes went back and forth until the 69–70 count, with UST trailing. Both teams went scoreless in the next three minutes until Cu and the Tamaraws' Jojo Valle traded baskets to up the score to 71–72 with 34 seconds left in the game. A botched play off the Goldies' last timeout caused the team a 30-second violation. In the next play, FEU held on to the ball until the buzzer sounded and were declared champions of the season. Serafico later resigned and was replaced by Eddie Pacheco, another former Goldie as the team's head coach.

Pido Jarencio set the scoring record for the season in 1982 when he made 50 points in their 116–93 win over NU in the first round. The team opened their season with an 82–91 loss to Adamson where Jarencio topscored for 15 points. Charlie Badion, who led Mapúa to the 1981 NCAA championship replaced Pacheco as coach of the Glowing Goldies. UST had the chance to qualify to the 1983 Finals when they tied UP at second place at the end of eliminations with an 8–4 record. They defeated the Maroons both times in the eliminations, with the second-round game ending on a 76–71 score. UP got payback by beating the Goldies in the playoff for the second Finals slot, which ended on a close 87–85 score.

The 1984 UAAP Finals was a best-of-three series, where the Glowing Goldies were once again facing UE. UST won in Game 2, behind Jarencio's 34 points to avenge their Game 1 loss to the Warriors. The Goldies kept up with UE's offense until the first five minutes of the second half when the Warriors started to shift gears to win the championship on a 112–99 score. Jarencio and UE's Allan Caidic, front runners in the MVP race turned the game into a shooting contest by scoring 48 and 46 points respectively. Jarencio, who was hobbled with four fouls from as early as the 22nd minute failed to get support from his teammates as he scored most of their points in the second half. The Goldies trailed by as much as 19 points late in the game. They had defeated UE in both games of the elimination rounds.

The Goldies and the Warriors met again in the 1985 UAAP Finals. The two teams were on equal footing as UE topped the first round with a 5–1 record, while the Goldies became the tournament's #1 seed with 9 wins against 3 losses. UE's lone loss in the first round was to the Glowing Goldies with Jarencio scoring a season high 43 points. The Warriors defeated FEU in a playoff for the second seed qualifier and then handily defeated UST in two games to crown themselves as champions for the second straight year.

Player migration
In 1987, the Glowing Goldies had to drop their top scorer Bennett Palad and big man Rabbi Tomacruz from the roster due to academic deficiencies. Tomacruz had failed to enroll in time for the submission of the lineup, making him ineligible for the season. Sophomore recruits Fedencio Oblina, and Rohimust Santos, Jr. stepped up in place of Palad and Tomacruz. After placing fourth at the end of the first round, UST won back-to-back games to move up to a tie for third place at the standings. It was then that officials of Adamson filed a protest against one of their players. The UAAP Board found Oblina to be ineligible for failing his NCEE qualifying tests which resulted to the reversal of four of UST's won games. The Glowing Goldies dropped to 7th place in the standings at 2–7 from their original 6–3 record. Aric del Rosario sat out in their next game and was replaced by then coach of the women's team Orly Bauzon. Oblina was handed a lifetime ban by the UAAP. The Goldies ended the season with 3 wins against 11 losses.

Bauzon formally replaced Del Rosario as the Goldies' head coach for the 1988 season. Palad was excluded from the roster for the second straight year for having exceeded the five-year playing limit in the UAAP. The league counted his participation in the PABL in 1987 as a playing year despite his absence from the UAAP. To add to the team's woes, starting point guard Alfrancis Chua quit the team in the first round of eliminations after a misunderstanding with a member of the coaching staff. Chua's decision to leave was finalized after a meeting with Bauzon and PE director Fr. Franklin Beltran. UST ended their season at seventh place for the second year with the same 3–11 record.

1989 saw a shakeup in UST's basketball program when the nucleus of their Golden Nuggets juniors basketball team made a surprising transfer to rival Adamson in the summer. The Nuggets, regarded as the tallest basketball team in the country with their 6'11" team captain EJ Feihl, 6'8" Marlou Aquino, and 6'6" Giovanni Pineda in the lineup had lost Aquino, Pineda, Manuel Cucio, and Gerard Hipolito in the transfer. Joining the high school players were the Nuggets' head coach Hector Hipolito and his assistant Charlie Dy, as well as seniors coach Orly Bauzon and sophomore player Bong dela Cruz, who was also a former Golden Nugget. Reports say that the exodus was caused by a rift between the school's administration and the coaching staff.

The Glowing Goldies made a turnaround in 1990 from their dismal 2-win season in 1989. They won eight straight games, with one coming from a reversal of their 10-point first round loss to La Salle after Green Archer Noli Locsin was declared ineligible by the board. The strong start was partly attributed to the presence of Feihl, their now 7-foot tall rookie center. Feihl unfortunately fell ill in the middle of the season and UST went on to lose all their remaining games for an 8–6 record and a tie at fourth place with FEU in the standings.

Despite Feihl's transfer to Adamson in 1991, the Goldies had a winning season, where they began their UAAP campaign on a five-game winning streak. They defeated FEU, 114–84 on opening day and went on to beat Ateneo, NU, and Adamson in their next games. They trailed the Falcons by more than ten points at the half, but made a comeback to win, 103–101. Their next match against UE also yielded a close 74–72 win before suffering back-to-back losses to close out the first round at second place with a 5–2 record. They won all but one game in the second round with an 80–85 loss to La Salle. They ended up tied with FEU at second place with an 11–3 record. They lost by six points to the Tamaraws in the playoff to determine La Salle's opponent in the Finals on an 89–95 score. The Goldies had complained of spotty officiating in the game, which at one point in the second half resulted to a 20-minute debris-pelting protest from the stands. The game, though, had not been close with FEU leading by as much as 23 points, and even as the Goldies were able to limit them to only two points coming from free throws in the last three and a half minutes, they were only able to come within nine points. The Goldies were also outrebounded by their opponents, 23–35. Dennis Espino, who made it to the Mythical selection topscored for UST with 23 points.

The Growling Tigers
As hosts of the 1992 tournament, UST unveiled a new mascot during the UAAP opening ceremonies following a change in their varsity moniker from the "Glowing Goldies" to the "Tigers". The move behind the renaming of the team was recalled in a 2007 speech by returning rector Fr. Rolando dela Rosa when he first assumed the position in 1991. Because the Goldies literally represented the gold and white school colors, UST never had a mascot for their varsity teams. The Tiger was chosen after Dela Rosa instructed Bro. Rolando Atienza, UST's PE moderator to come up with an appropriate mascot. For the second time in UAAP history, the Golden Tigers met FEU in a game that was interrupted by a power outage. Prior to the game, UST was tied with the Tamaraws at first place with a 10–2 record. They lost to La Salle, 80–82 and FEU lost to Adamson, resulting to a quadruple tie among the four teams with 10–3 records. In the Tigers' last game in the eliminations, power went out at the Loyola Center with 3:47 remaining in the game and with UST trailing, 56–68. The UAAP board decided to reschedule the last three minutes of the game on a later date. UST ended up losing, 76–87 and settled for fourth place with 10 wins against 4 losses. Team captain Udoy Belmonte and Rey Evangelista were chosen to the Mythical first team, while Espino made it to the second team.

14–0 season
In 1993, the UAAP implemented the Final Four semifinal playoffs to replace the outright Finals series between the top two teams. The Tigers started their season with a 27-point blowout win over Ateneo, and then went on to have easy wins in their next three games, including another 31-point rout over NU. Their next game against FEU was once again marred by a power failure when they played at the Araneta Coliseum, though the game was finished after a long delay with UST prevailing, 78–66. The team had been winning their games consistently that even when Aric del Rosario failed to show up in their match against NU due to a scheduling conflict, they were still able to win by 17 points. The Final Four was negated as the Tigers went on to sweep all 14 of their games and were declared automatic champions. Espino, who was declared MVP made it to the Mythical selection with teammates Patrick Fran and Rey Evangelista. Udoy Belmonte was selected to the Mythical second team.

UST–La Salle rivalry

The Growling Tigers met La Salle in the 1994 UAAP Finals for the first time since their overtime loss in the 1948 National Open Championship title match. The Green Archers joined the league as the UAAP's eighth member in 1986 under controversial circumstances. The school first applied for membership in 1981, but was denied when three of the seven-member schools voted against their acceptance due to the violent reputation brought about by their recent championship game in the NCAA. UST was among those that voted out La Salle. The school managed to get two-thirds of votes in their favor in 1985, paving the way to their entry to the UAAP.

Even with Adamson's suspension in 1994, the Tigers still struggled and could only manage to land at fourth place at the end of the first round with 3 wins against 3 losses. They turned the season around by winning five games including four straight in the second round for an 8–4 record that was good for third place and a spot in the Final Four playoffs. The Tigers also denied La Salle a season sweep when they won, 68–66 in the second round to also avenge their 73–83 loss in the previous round. They overcame UE's twice-to-beat advantage in the semifinals and had to force a deciding Game 3 in the Finals against La Salle to win their third back-to-back title since the 1948–49 and 1952–53 seasons. The Tigers also helped to achieve the UAAP's first and only triple championship after the Tiger Cubs and the Tigresses earlier won the titles in their respective divisions. Espino was named season MVP for the second straight year.

UST met La Salle and won the championship two more times in 1995 and 1996 for their second four-peat since the 1946–49 seasons. They topped the 1995 eliminations with an 11–3 record, but like in 1994, they had to beat the Archers in three games to win the title. They also struggled to defeat their Finals opponent in the second round by overcoming two overtime periods for an 87–84 win. They came in at second behind La Salle in the standings after the 1996 eliminations with a 10–4 record, but were able to sweep them in the best-of-three Finals. With the 1996 title, the Tigers became the second winningest team in the UAAP behind UE after claiming their 17th title. Chris Cantonjos won the 1995 MVP award, while Estong Ballesteros was selected to the 1996 Mythical team.

The Growling Tigers met the Green Archers yet again in the 1997 Final Four playoffs with UST holding a twice-to-beat advantage. The two teams split their two round-robin elimination games and finished with identical 10–4 records, but the Tigers had a superior +5 quotient over the Archers. UST lost in two games, with Game 2 going into overtime at 72–74.

After winning, 80–72 against UP in the playoff for the fourth semifinal slot, the Tigers faced the top-seeded Green Archers for their 1998 Final Four match. They lost in two games after taking Game 1 on a 55–51 win.

The Growling Tigers made it back to the Finals in 1999 and went up against La Salle for the fourth time since 1994. UST featured a rookie-laden roster, but among the players were four junior MVPs in Alwyn Espiritu, Derick Hubalde, Marvin Ortiguerra, and Emmerson Oreta. They won their first ten games and ended up tied at first place in the standings with La Salle at 11–3. It was their second best start since winning 17 straight from the 1993–94 seasons. The Tigers' second-round game against Ateneo had to be stopped after the referees failed to control the players' physicality which resulted to a melee at the Cuneta Astrodome. UST was leading, 50–46 before the stoppage. The last quarter of the game was continued a week later in a closed door match at the Lyceum Gym. The Tigers ended up losing to Ateneo, 60–63. UST ended up tied with La Salle at first place at the end of the elimination rounds with 11 wins and 3 losses, but lost the playoff for the #1 seed against the Green Archers. They met Ateneo again in the Final Four and won, 75–74. The championship series went down to a deciding Game 3 and the Tigers had the chance to win in regulation, with a two-point lead. UST's Gilbert Lao was fouled with 15 seconds remaining and split his free throws for a 67–64 score. La Salle's Dino Aldeguer then converted a three-point shot to send the game into overtime. The Archers went on to win, 78–75.

2000s
UST opened their 2000 season with a 54–65 loss to FEU, but bounced back with four straight wins. They then suffered back-to-back losses to end the first round with a 4–3 record in a tie for fourth place with UE. The team's inconsistency carried over to the second round and brought them the same fourth-place result at 8 wins and 6 losses for another tie with UE, who they defeated in the playoff for the fourth semifinal slot, 65–61. They once again lost to the #1 ranked La Salle in the Final Four, 62–65. The Tigers fell to a 0–11 scoring drought near the end of the first half for a 32–39 score. Derick Hubalde shot three straight three-pointers to come within three at 62–65 in the last 1:03 of the game. He was also able to force a La Salle turnover by stealing off Mon Jose, however, he failed to pass to the unguarded Cyrus Baguio and opted to take the shot himself. Hubalde missed a game-tying three to give La Salle the win and were again eliminated from the Finals for the third time since 1997.

The departure of key players caused the Growling Tigers to miss the Final Four for the first time in 2001 since the implementation of its format in 1993. Ortiguerra had already turned professional, while Baguio, Lao and Mel Latoreno were all dropped from the roster due to academic deficiencies. They started the season on a 4-game losing streak and ended the first round in a tie with UP at sixth place with a 2–5 record. The Tigers' back-to-back wins over Adamson and the front-running Ateneo to start the second round gave the team a resurgence at the Final Four, but went on to lose crucial games against NU, La Salle and FEU. They ended the season at sixth place with 6 wins and 8 losses, topped by a 76–72 win over UE. Warren de Guzman was selected to the All-rookie team at the awarding ceremonies.

With Cyrus Baguio back in the lineup for the 2002 season, the Growling Tigers also made it back to the Final Four. UST qualified to the semifinals despite losing to the #2 seed UE on the last game of the eliminations to finish at fourth place with an 8–6 record. They lost to La Salle once again in the Final Four, but the season for the Tigers had been promising after finishing as runners-up in the Ambrosio Padilla Cup in the summer and as semifinalists in the Father Martin Cup. They also qualified to participate in the Collegiate Champions League in the postseason.

Aric del Rosario stepped down as head coach at the end of the 2003 season after the Growling Tigers finished in a tie for fifth place with a 5–9 record. They won their last game of the eliminations over UP in overtime, 92–89.

Nel Parado replaced Del Rosario as interim coach beginning in the postseason when UST participated in the 2003 PBL Platinum Cup. Their respectable showing in the tournament earned Parado a nod and a permanent tenure from the school's Institute of the Physical Education and Athletics. The Growling Tigers were off to a fair start in their 2004 UAAP campaign as they ended the first round tied at third place with La Salle and UE with a 4–3 record. UST, however failed to win a single game in the second round to finish the season at seventh place with a 4–10 record.

The Growling Tigers broke their 1989 record for their worst start when they went 0–5 to open the 2005 season. Their 12-game losing streak which began at the start of the second round of the previous season ended with their 107–100 overtime win over the winless NU Bulldogs. NU got back at UST with a 74–73 second round win for their first and only victory of the season. The Tigers ended the elimination rounds with the same 4–10 record from 2004, but on a higher rank at sixth place above Adamson and NU. The lone highlight of their campaign was when they stopped Ateneo's seven-game win streak in the second round by winning, 77–73. It was a turnaround for the team after placing third in the Father Martin Cup and winning the PRISAA tournament in the offseason. Jervy Cruz, who was a member of their training pool won the PRISAA MVP award. He was set to play his first year in the UAAP, but was pulled out of the roster due to academic deficiencies.

When Parado's contract expired in February 2006, UST hired Pido Jarencio, their former star player who had made a name for himself in the Philippine Basketball Association. Jarencio, though, had no prior coaching experience which made critics question the school's decision to choose him as Parado's replacement. This observation was made evident when the Tigers went 2–4 in the first round of eliminations of the 2006 season. The teams had played one less game in each of the rounds with the absence of La Salle due to their suspension for the season. Things began to turn around for UST in their third game in the second round when they defeated the NU Bulldogs, 75–67 to end a four-game losing streak and improve their record to 3–5 to move to a tie for fourth place with Adamson and NU. The Tigers went on a three-game win streak, the last of which was an 88–80 overtime win over league-leading Ateneo to snap the Blue Eagles' undefeated record and avenge their 78–114 blowout loss in the first round. UST defeated Adamson, 77–74 in their last game of the eliminations to tie the Falcons at third place with a 6–6 record. They defeated Adamson again in the playoff for the #3 seed prior to the Final Four pairings. In defeating the second-seeded UE Red Warriors, the Growling Tigers became the fifth team in the UAAP Final Four era to advance to the Finals on a twice-to-beat disadvantage. They had reached the Finals for the first time since the 1999 playoff games. UST captured the UAAP title in three games after a 76–74 overtime win against Ateneo for their 18th championship in the league. Jojo Duncil was named Finals MVP, while Jarencio was hailed Coach of the Year. Jervy Cruz was earlier selected to the Mythical team during the ceremony for the individual awards.

UST failed to defend their championship after they were eliminated in the 2007 playoffs. The Tigers, who ended up tied at fourth place with FEU at the end of eliminations with an 8–6 record, were looking to qualify to the stepladder semifinals after UE went undefeated and automatically qualified to the Finals. They defeated the Tamaraws in a playoff for the remaining semifinal slot where their opponents were limited to just six points in the second quarter. They then lost their knockout game to the third-seeded Ateneo Blue Eagles, 64–69 in the first round of the stepladder semifinals, signifying the end of their UAAP season. Jervy Cruz, who topped the statistical points tally was named season MVP.

The Tigers missed the playoffs for the fifth time in the last eight years when they ended the 2008 season at fifth place with a 6–8 record. Cruz was selected to the Mythical team for the third straight year.

Despite winning only six games, the Growling Tigers had qualified to the Final Four after the NU Bulldogs defeated and eliminated La Salle at the end of the 2009 eliminations. UST finished the first round with 4 wins against 3 losses, but only managed to win two games in the second round. The Adamson Falcons had the same 4–3 record in the first round, but fared worse by winning only a single game in the next round. La Salle had a chance to overtake UST had they won over NU due to a superior +13 quotient over the Tigers. UST lost to defending champions Ateneo, 64–81 in their Final Four match. Team captain Dylan Ababou was named MVP and scoring leader of the season, while Jeric Teng won the Rookie of the year award.

2010s
In what was Jarencio's worst win–loss record as coach in the UAAP, the Growling Tigers ended their 2010 season at seventh place with a 4–10 record. UST placed fifth after the first round of eliminations with a 3–4 record, but were only able to secure a single win in the next round. Except for their opening game against the UE Red Warriors where they won by 13 points, the scores of the rest of their wins were from close-scoring matches, including their first round match against UP which went into overtime.

The Growling Tigers who celebrated their quadricentennial year in 2011 made it back to the Final Four after finishing the eliminations at fourth place with an 8–6 record. They were beaten anew by the four-peat seeking Ateneo Blue Eagles in their playoff game, 66–69. UST had trailed Ateneo by ten points in the last three minutes of the game, but were able to bring the lead down to three with five seconds remaining. Jeric Fortuna missed a three-point attempt to end the game in defeat.

UST made it back to the Finals in 2012 after defeating the NU Bulldogs, who qualified to the Final Four for the first time in 11 years. The Tigers finished second at the end of eliminations with a 10–4 record, but were swept in their championship series by the Ateneo Blue Eagles, making their opponents five-peat champions of the tournament. Karim Abdul was selected to the Mythical team during the awarding ceremony for individual players. UST won the Philippine Collegiate Champions League title in the postseason after beating Ateneo in a three-game series. Jeric Teng was named tournament MVP.

The Growling Tigers reached the Finals again and faced the La Salle Green Archers for the first time since their 1999 championship series. Their 73-72 Game 1 win snapped the Archers' nine-game winning streak. La Salle went on to win the next two games to bag the 2013 championship. UST made it to the Finals when they defeated the NU Bulldogs in the Final Four with a twice-to-win disadvantage and became the first fourth-ranked team in UAAP history to eliminate the #1 seed in a playoff series.

Jarencio resigned in January 2014 after accepting an offer to coach in the PBA. His assistant Bong dela Cruz who was also a former Glowing Goldie was appointed as his replacement. With their key players falling to injuries and the unfamiliarity of a new system, the Growling Tigers failed to advance to the semifinals. They finished the season on a four-game losing streak to place sixth with a 5–9 record. Karim Abdul made it to the Mythical team for the third straight year. The team had a successful preseason with their runner-up finish in the Father Martin Cup in the summer.

UST made it to the Finals for the third time in four years after defeating the 2014 champions, the NU Bulldogs in the Final Four. NU has been the Tigers' semifinal opponent for the third time in the last four years. The Growling Tigers became the fifth team in UAAP history to reach the Finals after missing the playoffs in the previous season. FEU defeated UST in three games to win their 20th championship and their first after a decade. The Tigers who were facing FEU in the finals for the first time since 1979 won both games against them in the eliminations. Kevin Ferrer and Ed Daquioag were selected to the Mythical team during the presentation of awards for Season 78.

Another former Glowing Goldie was tapped to be the new head coach of the Growling Tigers beginning in the 2016 season. Controversies hounded the team immediately after the 2015 season ended which prompted Dela Cruz to step down and be replaced by Boy Sablan, who was a teammate of Pido Jarencio in the 1980s. The ill-prepared Tigers who lost Ferrer, Daquioag and Abdul to graduation only managed to win three games to record their worst win–loss record in the Final Four era.

The Tigers sank further when they almost went winless in 2017. The team went on a 17-game losing streak that dated back from the second round of the previous season. Their lone win, which has become UST's worst record eclipsed their 2–12 season in 1989. Sablan was terminated at the end of the season.

When champion coach Aldin Ayo announced his resignation from La Salle in December 2017, talks of his transfer to UST went abuzz. He eventually confirmed his appointment in January through a post on his social media account. During the elimination rounds, the Tigers' key players suffered injuries with Steve Akomo getting a concussion and CJ Cansino tearing his left ACL, causing both to bow out of the 2018 season. They were fourth in the standings at one point during the second round, but they lost all four of their remaining games to crash out of the Final Four and finish sixth with a 5–9 record.

The Growling Tigers overcame two semifinal do-or-die matches to reach the 2019 Finals against the undefeated Ateneo Blue Eagles. They ended the eliminations having the same 8–6 record of FEU, but were ranked lower at fourth place due to an inferior -6 quotient. They defeated the Tamaraws, 81–71 in a knockout match and then took down the second-seeded UP Fighting Maroons in two games in the second stage of the stepladder playoffs. They were then swept by Ateneo in their best-of-three championship series. Soulémane Chabi Yo was named season MVP, while Mark Nonoy won the Rookie of the Year award.

2020s
When news broke out on August 20, 2020, that Cansino had been kicked out of the team, it was revealed that the Tigers had been staying in Sorsogon since June. Ayo resigned amid ongoing investigations by the school, the UAAP, the Commission on Higher Education, and the Games and Amusements Board on possible health protocols and quarantine violations that may have been committed by the group. Former Tigers team captain Jino Manansala was appointed interim coach in place of Ayo. In the aftermath, 12 of the 16 players from the 2019 team transferred to other schools, with Cansino going to UP, the trio of Rhenz Abando, Brent Paraiso and Ira Bataller to Letran, and Mark Nonoy and Deo Cuajao to La Salle. Tiger Cub center JB Lina withdrew his commitment to play for the Tigers' senior men's team and proceeded to enroll at UP.

The UAAP Board announced the cancellation of Season 83 on December 11, 2020. It marked the first time since World War II that an entire season is cancelled by the league. Season 82 was also cut short with the similar cancellation of the games in the second semester of the academic year due to the extended community quarantine from the COVID-19 pandemic.

The belatedly-run 84th season of the UAAP began in the second semester of the 2021-22 school year in March 2022, and even as training and preparations for the tournament had been ongoing since Manansala took over the team in October 2020, the composition of their roster could not immediately be finalized due to player transfers. Reigning MVP Soulémane Chabi Yo left the team in November 2021 after the announcement of the cancellation of Season 83. He decided to join a semi-professional team in the Liga EBA in Spain.

The 2021 squad won only three games and were riddled with blowout losses throughout the season, as they ended the tournament on a six-game losing streak. Their 50-point defeat at the hands of the Ateneo Blue Eagles, in particular, broke the league's record for the largest losing margin since record-keeping has been automated in 2003.

Manansala's assistant coaches, led by McJour Luib tendered their resignation at the end of the tournament. The futile efforts to reinstate former coach Aldin Ayo played a big role in the coaching staff's departure. Manansala, meanwhile, was reassigned to coach the school's high school program, as rumors of a corporate backer taking over team management began circulating around the sporting community.

The IPEA announced in July 2022 the appointment of former Growling Tiger and PBA player Bal David as the team's new head coach. With sporting events all around going back to normal, UST participated in the preseason tournaments by joining the PBA D-League and Filoil. Manansala and former Tiger Cubs coach Albert Alocillo served as interim coaches to the two tournaments as they were transitioning to a new system under David.

Even as the Tigers fared well in the preseason, they were waylayed by the decommitment of their prized recruits. Fil-American Gani Stevens, who came along Minnesota teammate Willie Wilson in April 2022 made a surprise transfer to the UE Red Warriors' camp in August. Kean Baclaan, their high-scoring point guard, meanwhile decided to leave for the NU Bulldogs a few days after news on Stevens was reported. The team's lineup was further depleted after veterans Sherwin Concepcion and Bryan Santos were both ruled ineligible by the UAAP for having exceeded the league's age limit. With seven new players in the roster, the Tigers won only one game in the 2022 season. After winning their opening game against the Adamson Falcons, UST went on a 13-game losing streak to match their 2017 record for the fewest games won in the team's history. At the end of the elimination rounds, Nic Cabañero and Adama Faye led the league in scoring and rebounds with averages of 17.6 points and 12.2 rebounds per game respectively.

Coaches
The Growling Tigers have had 20 coaches in around a century's existence of their basketball program. Jino Manansala was recently appointed interim coach following Aldin Ayo's resignation in the wake of the Sorsogon Bubble controversy.

In the team's history, five of their head coaches became coaches of the national team, and four went on to coach teams in the Philippine Basketball Association.

Herr Silva and Aric del Rosario are the team's longest tenured coaches, each compiling 17 years in service. Silva's years at the helm of the Goldies were interwoven with Fely Fajardo's tenure in the 1950s and included a one-game stint as an interim coach in 1964 after Fajardo's abrupt resignation prior to the start of the UAAP season. He is also the school's winningest coach with nine championships, the first of which were six straight titles from 1939 until 1949 (interrupted by the war), and then a three-peat from 1951 to 1953. Del Rosario was promoted head coach in 1985 following a stint with UST's junior basketball program. He stepped down after three years following a controversy involving one of his players' eligibility. He came back in 1990 and led the Tigers to a four-year championship run, the first of which was an undefeated 1993 campaign.

Silva was also enshrined to the PSC's Philippine Sports Hall of Fame in 2010 as coach of the 1954 national team that competed in the Brazil World Championship. Chito Calvo was included in the fourth batch of inductees in 2021. He was also enshrined to the FIBA Hall of Fame as a contributor to the sport in 2007. Both coaches were honored with the Lifetime Achievement Award by the National Basketball Hall of Fame Foundation in 1999.

Season-by-season record

Pre-UAAP era

Pre-Final Four era

Final Four era

Final Four seeding history

Current roster

Awards

Team

UAAP
Champions: 
Runners-up: 
3rd place: 
NCAA
Champions: 1930
Runners-up: 1929
Big Three League
Champions: 
National Open Championships
Champions: 
Runners-up: 1948
National Intercollegiate
Champions: 
Runners-up: 
3rd place: 1966
National Students Basketball Championship
Runners-up: 1988
3rd place: 1992

National Seniors Basketball Championship
Champions: 1996
Philippine Collegiate Champions League
Champions: 2012
3rd place: 2002
Fr. Martin Cup Basketball Tournament
Champions: 1996
Runners-up: 
3rd place: 2005
PRISAA Basketball Tournament
Champions: 
Home and Away Invitational League
Runners-up: 2005
McDonald's Cup Battle of Champions
Champions: 1994
Runners-up: 1996
Millennium Basketball League
Champions: 2011, 2013
Runners-up: 2009
Ambrosio Padilla Cup
Runners-up: 2002

Individual

Francisco Vestil
1947 UAAP MVP
Ning Ramos
1952 UAAP MVP
1952 UAAP Mythical team
Ramon Manulat
1952 UAAP Mythical team
Francis Wilson
1954 UAAP Mythical team
Eddie Pacheco
1954 UAAP Mythical 2nd team
Valentino Rosabal
1960 UAAP Rookie of the Year
1963 UAAP MVP
Aric del Rosario
1963 UAAP Rookie of the Year
Dennis Espino
1991, 1993, 1994 UAAP Mythical team
1992 UAAP Mythical 2nd team
1993, 1994 UAAP MVP
Rudolf Belmonte
1992 UAAP Mythical team
1993 UAAP Mythical 2nd team
Rey Evangelista
1992, 1993 UAAP Mythical team
Patrick Fran
1993 UAAP Mythical team

Chris Cantonjos
1995 UAAP MVP
1995 UAAP Mythical team
Gerard Francisco
1995 UAAP Rookie of the Year
Ernesto Ballesteros
1996 UAAP Mythical team
Marvin Ortiguerra
1998, 1999 UAAP Mythical team
Richard Yee
1998 UAAP Mythical 2nd team
Warren de Guzman
2001 UAAP All-rookie team
Cyrus Baguio
2002 UAAP Mythical team
Jervy Cruz
2005 PRISAA MVP
2006, 2007, 2008 UAAP Mythical team
2007 UAAP MVP
Jojo Duncil
2006 UAAP Finals MVP
Pido Jarencio
2006 UAAP Coach of the Year
2012 PCCL Coach of the Year
Clark Bautista
2008 UAAP All-rookie team

Dylan Ababou
2009 UAAP MVP
2009 UAAP Mythical team
2009 UAAP Scoring leader
Jeric Teng
2009 UAAP Rookie of the Year
2012 PCCL MVP
2012 PCCL Mythical team
Allein Maliksi
2009 Millennium Basketball League MVP
Karim Abdul
2012, 2013, 2014 UAAP Mythical team
2012 PCCL Mythical team
Jeric Fortuna
2011 Millennium Basketball League MVP
2012 PCCL Mythical team
Kevin Ferrer
2015 UAAP Mythical team
Ed Daquioag
2013 Millennium Basketball League MVP
2015 UAAP Mythical team
Renzo Subido
2018 Kim Lope Asis Invitational MVP
Soulémane Chabi Yo
2019 UAAP MVP
2019 UAAP Mythical team
Mark Nonoy
2019 UAAP Rookie of the Year

Notable players

Succession of team captains

Retired jerseys

Chris Cantonjos' jersey No. 15 has been retired in recognition of his contributions to the team's four-peat championship that includes an undefeated season in 1993, as well as for being named MVP and a two-time member of the Mythical team. The No. 15, however, remains in circulation and has since been used by the following players:
Robert Hainga, 2012–13
Jeepy Faundo, 2014–17
Toby Agustin, 2018
Kenji Duremdes, 2022–present

Jino Manansala had used the No. 15 during his rookie year in 1999 before settling for the No. 11 in 2001.

Hall of Fame inductees

National team appearances

 Jose Rodriguez
1923 Far Eastern Games
 Jacinto Ciria Cruz
1930, 1934 Far Eastern Games
1936 Olympics
 Primitivo Martinez
1934 Far Eastern Games
1936, 1948 Olympics
 Herminio Silva
1934 Far Eastern Games
1954 FIBA World Championship (coach)
1954 Asian Games (coach)
 Ramoncito Campos
1948 Olympics
 Francisco Vestil
1948 Olympics (flag bearer)
 Felicisimo Fajardo
1948 Olympics (captain)
1952 Olympics (coach)
1963, 1965 ABC Championship (coach)
1966 Asian Games (coach)
 Gabby Fajardo
1948 Olympics
 Pocholo Martinez
1951 Asian Games (captain)
1952 Olympics (captain)
 Genaro Fernandez
1951 Asian Games
 Ning Ramos
1951, 1954 Asian Games
1971 ABC Championship (coach)
1972 Olympics (coach)
 Paing Hechanova
1951 Asian Games
1954 Asian Games (captain)
1952 Olympics
 Napoleon Flores
1954 FIBA World Championship
1954 Asian Games
 Ramon Manulat
1954, 1958, 1962 Asian Games
1954, 1959 FIBA World Championship
1956 Olympics
 Francis Wilson
1958, 1962 Asian Games
1959 FIBA World Championship (alternate)
 Roberto Yburan
1959 FIBA World Championship
1960 Olympics
1960 ABC Championship
 Eddie Pacheco
1960 Olympics
1960, 1963 ABC Championship
1962 Asian Games
 Cristobal Ramas
1960 Olympics
 Sonny Reyes
1963, 1965, 1967 ABC Championship
1966, 1970 Asian Games
1968 Olympics
 Orly Bauzon
1965, 1967 ABC Championship
1968 Olympics
1970 Asian Games

 Danny Florencio
1966, 1970, 1974 Asian Games
1967 ABC Championship
1968, 1972 Olympics
 Bogs Adornado
1968, 1972 Olympics
1970 ABC Youth Championship
1973 ABC Championship
1974 FIBA World Championship
1974 Asian Games
 Lawrence Mumar
1969, 1971 ABC Championship
1973 ABC Championship (alternate)
 Edmund Yee
1978 ABC Youth Championship
 Ed Cordero
1980 ABC Youth Championship
1981 ABC Championship
1981 Southeast Asian Games
 Pido Jarencio
1985 ABC Championship
 Benjie Gutierrez
1985 ABC Championship (alternate)
 Bobby Jose
1986 ABC Youth Championship
 Gido Babilonia
1989, 1999 ABC Championships
1989 Southeast Asian Games
 EJ Feihl
1990 ABC U-18 Championship
 Joaquin Dindo Torres
1990 ABC U-18 Championship
 Patrick Fran
1992 ABC U-18 Championship
1993, 1995 ABC Championship
 Dennis Espino
1992 ABC U-18 Championship
1993 ABC Championship
1998, 2002 Asian Games
 Chris Cantonjos
1992 ABC U-18 Championship
1995, 1997 Southeast Asian Games
1995, 1997 ABC Championship
1996 ABC U-22 Championship
1996, 1998 SEABA Championship
 Rudolf Belmonte
1993 ABC Championship (captain)
 Renato Cabaluna
1990 ABC U-19 Championship
1993 ABC Championship
 Edmund Reyes
1993 ABC Championship
 Rey Evangelista
1993 ABC Championship
1994 Asian Games
 Siot Tanquingcen
1993, 1995 ABC Championship
1993 Southeast Asian Games
 Dale Singson
1993 Southeast Asian Games
1996 ABC U-22 Championship
1996 SEABA Championship
 Gelo Velasco
1994 ABC Youth Championship

 Joel Villanueva
1994 SEABA U-19 Championship
 Billy Reyes
1995 ABC Championship
1996 ABC U-22 Championship
1996 SEABA Championship
 Bal David
1995 Southeast Asian Games
 Richard Melencio
1995, 1997, 2003 Southeast Asian Games
1996 ABC U-22 Championship
1997, 1999, 2003 ABC Championship
1998, 2003 SEABA Championship
 Ernesto Ballesteros
1996 SEABA Championship
 Melchor Latoreno
1996 SEABA U-18 Championship
1996 ABC U-18 Championship
2005 SEABA Championship
 Gerard Francisco
1996 ABC U-22 Championship
1997 ABC Championship
1997 Southeast Asian Games
 Emmerson Oreta
1998 SEABA U-18 Championship
2003 ABC Championship
2003 SEABA Championship
 Cyrus Baguio
1998 SEABA U-18 Championship
1998 ABC U-18 Championship
2009 FIBA Asia Championship
2009 SEABA Championship
 Niño Gelig
1998 SEABA U-18 Championship
1998 ABC U-18 Championship
 Aric del Rosario
2003 ABC Championship (coach)
2003 SEABA Championship (coach)
2003 Southeast Asian Games (coach)
 Dylan Ababou
2004 SEABA U-18 Championship
2011 SEABA Championship
 Mark Canlas
2004 ABC U-18 Championship
 Dondon Villamin
2005 SEABA Championship
 Christian Luanzon
2005 SEABA Championship
 Jervy Cruz
2007 Southeast Asian Games
 Kent Lao
2012 SEABA U-18 Championship
 Kevin Ferrer
2015 SEABA Championship
2015 Southeast Asian Games
 Allein Maliksi
2017 SEABA Championship
2019 FIBA World Qualifying

Growling Tigers in the PBA draft

Facilities

 Quadricentennial Pavilion 2012–present
The Growling Tigers train and practice at the Quadricentennial Pavilion (formerly called the UST Sports Complex), located across the Faculty of Engineering's Fr. Roque Ruaño Building on España Boulevard. The four-story building houses a basketball court with a seating capacity of 5,792. Construction began in 2011, with the facility forming part of the school's numerous projects in commemoration of the 400th year of their foundation.
 UST Gymnasium 1932–2011
The old gym, which was demolished in April 2011 used to host home games of the then Glowing Goldies during the prewar UAAP until early 1946 prior to the games' transfer to the Rizal Memorial Coliseum. The transfer and the shift from the home-and-away format was necessitated after an accident occurred at the UST Gym.

Controversies 
In the early part of the 2016, the Growling Tigers management investigated UST head coach Bong dela Cruz for the alleged involvement in game-fixing. A report from sports news website Fastbreak states from a source that the management disbanded the men's basketball team due to game-fixing and sell-out games allegations.

Another report from Spin.ph notes that Dela Cruz accused for maltreatment and abusive incidents against some of the players, particularly players from Team B, during his two-year term as a coach. Sooner, the media has yet to confirm the statement regarding the issue on Dela Cruz.

Dela Cruz, later in a statement released on February 1, 2016, said that since the issues emerged, he decided to keep quiet about it. He denies the allegations against him and is confident that he will be proven innocent of the issues against him.

In 2017–2018 season, two players named Mario Bonleon and Renzo Subido decided not to play with UST under Sablan for different reasons, the team standing of the senior's basketball is one of the worst in the history of the UST Growling Tigers at 1 win and 13 losses. Because of that standing, Sablan and the entire coaching staff were sacked by no other than the Rector of the UST effective November 30, 2017, terminating their contracts which will be expiring in August 2018. UST Tigresses Assistant Coach Arsenio Dysangco Jr. was appointed as overseer during practices.

Notes

References

 
Growling Tigers men's basketball
Former Philippine Basketball League teams
University Athletic Association of the Philippines basketball teams